The mature minor doctrine is a rule of law found in the United States and Canada accepting that an unemancipated minor patient may possess the maturity to choose or reject a particular health care treatment, sometimes without the knowledge or agreement of parents, and should be permitted to do so. It is now generally considered a form of patients rights; formerly, the mature minor rule was largely seen as protecting health care providers from criminal and civil claims by parents of minors at least 15.

Jurisdictions may codify an age of medical consent, accept the judgment of licensed providers regarding an individual minor, or accept a formal court decision following a request that a patient be designated a mature minor, or may rely on some combination. For example, patients at least 16 may be assumed to be mature minors for this purpose, patients aged 13 to 15 may be designated so by licensed providers, and pre-teen patients may be so-designated after evaluation by an agency or court. The mature minor doctrine is sometimes connected with enforcing confidentiality of minor patients from their parents.

Statute
In the United States, a typical statute lists: "Who may consent [or withhold consent for] surgical or medical treatment or procedures."
"...Any unemancipated minor of sufficient intelligence to understand and appreciate the consequences of the proposed surgical or medical treatment or procedures, for himself."

Medical emancipation

By definition, a "mature minor" has been found to have the capacity for decisional autonomy, or the right to make decisions including whether to undergo risky medical but potentially life-saving medical decisions alone, without parental approval. By contrast, "medical emancipation" formally releases children from some parental involvement requirements but does not necessarily grant that decision making to children themselves. Pursuant to statute, several jurisdictions grant medical emancipation to a minor who has become pregnant or requires sexual-health services, thereby permitting medical treatment without parental consent and, often, confidentiality from parents. A limited guardianship may be appointed to make medical decisions for the medically emancipated minor and the minor may not be permitted to refuse or even choose treatment.

History
One significant early U.S. case, Smith v. Seibly, 72 Wn.2d 16, 431 P.2d 719 (1967), before the Washington Supreme Court, establishes precedent on the mature minor doctrine. The plaintiff, Albert G. Smith, an 18-year-old married father, was suffering from myasthenia gravis, a progressive disease. Because of this, Smith expressed concern that his wife might become burdened in caring for him, for their existing child and possibly for additional children. On March 9, 1961, while still 18, Smith requested a vasectomy. His doctor required written consent, which Smith provided, and the surgery was performed. Later, after reaching Washington's statutory age of majority, then 21, the doctor was sued by Smith, who now claimed that he had been a minor and thus unable to grant surgical or medical consent. The Court rejected Smith's argument: "Thus, age, intelligence, maturity, training, experience, economic independence or lack thereof, general conduct as an adult and freedom from the control of parents are all factors to be considered in such a case [involving consent to surgery]."

The court further quoted another recently decided case, Grannum v. Berard, 70 Wn.2d 304, 307, 422 P.2d 812 (1967): "The mental capacity necessary to consent to a surgical operation is a question of fact to be determined from the circumstances of each individual case." The court explicitly stated that a minor may grant surgical consent even without formal emancipation.

Especially since the 1970s, older pediatric patients sought to make autonomous decisions regarding their own treatment, and sometimes sued successfully to do so. The decades of accumulated evidence tended to demonstrate that children are capable of participating in medical decision-making in a meaningful way; and legal and medical communities have demonstrated an increasing willingness to formally affirm decisions made by young people, even regarding life and death.

Religious beliefs have repeatedly influenced a patient's decision to choose treatment or not. In a case in 1989 in Illinois, a 17-year-old female Jehovah's Witness was permitted to refuse necessary life saving treatments.

In 1990, the United States Congress passed the Patient Self-Determination Act; even though key provisions apply only to patients over age 18, the legislation advanced patient involvement in decision-making. The West Virginia Supreme Court, in Belcher v. Charleston Area Medical Center (1992) defined a "mature minor" exception to parental consent, according consideration to seven factors to be weighed regarding such a minor: age, ability, experience, education, exhibited judgment, conduct, and appreciation of relevant risks and consequences.

The 2000s and 2010s experienced a number of outbreaks of vaccine-preventable diseases, such as the 2019–2020 measles outbreaks, which were fueled in part by vaccine hesitancy. This prompted minors to seek vaccinations over objections from their parents. Beginning in the 2020s during the COVID-19 pandemic, minors also began seeking out the COVID-19 vaccine over the objections of their vaccine-hesitant parents. This has led to proposals and bills allowing minor to consent to be administered with any approved vaccine.

Laws by jurisdiction

Canada
The Supreme Court of Canada recognized mature minor doctrine in 2009 in A.C. v. Manitoba [2009] SCC 30; in provinces and territories lacking relevant statutes, common law is presumed to be applied.

United States
Several states permit minors to legally consent to medical treatment without parental consent or over parental objections. In addition, many other states allow minors to consent to medical procedures under a more limited set of circumstances. These include providing limited minor autonomy only in enumerated cases, such as blood donation, substance abuse, sexual and reproductive health (including abortion and sexually transmitted infections), or for emergency medical services. Many states also exempt specific groups of minors from parental consent, such as homeless youth, emancipated minors, minor parents, or married minors. Further complicating matters is the interaction between state tort law, state contract law, and federal law, depending on if the clinic accepts federal funding under Title X or Medicaid.

Withholding of consent

United States
In the United States, bodily integrity has long been considered a common law right; the United States Supreme Court, in 1891's Union Pacific Railway Company v. Botsford, found, "No right is held more sacred, or is more carefully guarded, by the common law, than the right of every individual to the possession and control of his own person, free from all restraint or interference of others, unless by clear and unquestionable authority of law." The Supreme Court in 1990 (Cruzan v. Director, Missouri Department of Health) allowed that "constitutionally protected liberty interest in refusing unwanted medical treatment may be inferred" in the Due Process Clause of the Fourteenth Amendment to the United States Constitution, but the Court refrained from explicitly establishing what would have been a newly enumerated right. Nevertheless, lower courts have increasingly held that competent patients have the right to refuse any treatment for themselves.

In 1989, the Supreme Court of Illinois interpreted the Supreme Court of the United States to have already adopted major aspects of mature minor doctrine, concluding,
Although the United States Supreme Court has not broadened this constitutional right of minors beyond abortion cases, the [Illinois] appellate court found such an extension "inevitable." ...Nevertheless, the Supreme Court has not held that a constitutionally based right to refuse medical treatment exists, either for adults or minors. ...[U.S. Supreme Court] cases do show, however, that no "bright line" age restriction of 18 is tenable in restricting the rights of mature minors, [thus] mature minors may possess and exercise rights regarding medical care... If the evidence is clear and convincing that the minor is mature enough to appreciate the consequences of her actions, and that the minor is mature enough to exercise the judgment of an adult, then the mature minor doctrine affords her the common law right to consent to or refuse medical treatment [including life and death cases, with some considerations].

In 2016 the case of "In re Z.M." was heard in Maryland regarding a minor's right to refuse chemotherapy.

In Connecticut, Cassandra C. a seventeen-year-old, was ordered by the Connecticut Supreme Court to receive treatment. The court decided that Cassandra was not mature enough to make medical decisions.

Canada
In 2009, the Supreme Court of Canada ruling in A.C. v. Manitoba [2009] SCC 30 (CanLII) found that children may make life and death decisions about their medical treatment. In the majority opinion, Justice Rosalie Abella wrote:
"The result of this [decision] is that young people under 16 will have the right to demonstrate mature medical decisional capacity. ...If, after a careful analysis of the young person’s ability to exercise mature and independent judgment, the court is persuaded that the necessary level of maturity exists, the young person’s views ought to be respected."
A "dissenting" opinion by Justice Ian Binnie would have gone further:
"At common law, proof of capacity entitles the 'mature minor' to exercise personal autonomy in making medical treatment decisions free of parental or judicial control. ...[A] young person with capacity is entitled to make the treatment decision, not just to have 'input' into a judge’s consideration of what the judge believes to be the young person's best interests."
Analysts note that the Canadian decision merely requires that younger patients be permitted a hearing, and still allows a judge to "decide whether or not to order a medical procedure on an unwilling minor".

See also
 Emancipation of minors
 Marion's Case (Australia)
 Gillick competence (UK)
 Age of consent
 Age of majority

References

Family law
American legal terminology
Rights
Age and society
Health law in the United States
Health policy
Health law in Canada
Juvenile law
Medical ethics
Canadian legal terminology
Minimum ages
Family law legal terminology